The 105th Squadron was a squadron of the 3rd Air Wing of the Japan Air Self-Defense Force (JASDF) based at Komaki Air Base in Aichi Prefecture, Japan. It was equipped with North American F-86D Sabre aircraft.

History
On March 15, 1962 the squadron was formed at Komaki Air Base. It followed the 103rd Squadron. There was no 104th squadron formed because the JASDF had already decided to introduce the Lockheed F-104 Starfighter as the next interceptor.

It was disbanded on December 1, 1967, on the same day as fellow Komaki unit 102nd Squadron.

Aircraft operated

Fighter aircraft
 North American F-86D Sabre（1962-1967）

See also
 Fighter units of the Japan Air Self-Defense Force

References

Units of the Japan Air Self-Defense Force